Kennan may refer to:

Places 
United States
 Kennan, Wisconsin, a village 
 Kennan (town), Wisconsin, a town

Other uses 
 Kennan (name)
 KH-11 Kennan, a type of American reconnaissance satellite

See also
Cannan